Kejetia vs Makola is a Ghanaian courtroom satirical comic TV series which introduces us to a comedic role of a court system. In this comedy series, two categories of lawyers are portrayed. A group of well educated lawyers from Makola and self-acclaimed individuals who call themselves lawyers from Kejetia representing their clients respectively. The show is produced by Lezer Legacy Productions.

Cast 

 Richmond Xavier Amoakoh - as Lawyer Nti
 Louis Lamis
 Nana Gyasi Owusu
 Clemento Suarez
 General Ntatia
 Isaac Antwi - as Punisher

Invited guests 

 KiDi
 Kwaku Darlington
 Efia Odo
 Kuami Eugene
 Amerado
 Lord Paper

References

Ghanaian television series
2010s Ghanaian television series
2017 Ghanaian television series debuts